Stockholm is the capital and largest city of Sweden as well as the largest urban area in Scandinavia. Approximately 990,000 people live in the municipality, with 1.6 million in the urban area, and 2.5 million in the metropolitan area. The city stretches across fourteen islands where Lake Mälaren flows into the Baltic Sea. Outside the city to the east, and along the coast, is the island chain of the Stockholm archipelago. The area has been settled since the Stone Age, in the 6th millennium BC, and was founded as a city in 1252 by Swedish statesman Birger Jarl. It is also the county seat of Stockholm County. For several hundred years, Stockholm was the capital of Finland as well, which was then a part of Sweden. The population of the municipality of Stockholm is expected to reach one million people in 2024.

Stockholm is the cultural, media, political, and economic centre of Sweden. The Stockholm region alone accounts for over a third of the country's GDP, and is among the top 10 regions in Europe by GDP per capita. Ranked as an alpha-global city, it is the largest in Scandinavia and the main centre for corporate headquarters in the Nordic region. The city is home to some of Europe's top ranking universities, such as the Karolinska Institute, Stockholm School of Economics, KTH Royal Institute of Technology and Stockholm University. It hosts the annual Nobel Prize ceremonies and banquet at the Stockholm Concert Hall and Stockholm City Hall. One of the city's most prized museums, the Vasa Museum, is the most visited non-art museum in Scandinavia. The Stockholm metro, opened in 1950, is well known for the decor of its stations; it has been called the longest art gallery in the world. Sweden's national football arena is located north of the city centre, in Solna. Avicii Arena, the national indoor arena, is in the southern part of the city. The city was the host of the 1912 Summer Olympics.

Stockholm is the seat of the Swedish government and most of its agencies, including the highest courts in the judiciary, and the official residencies of the Swedish monarch and the Prime Minister. The government has its seat in the Rosenbad building, the Riksdag (Swedish parliament) is seated in the Parliament House, and the Prime Minister's residence is adjacent at Sager House. Stockholm Palace is the official residence and principal workplace of the Swedish monarch, while Drottningholm Palace in neighboring Ekerö serves as the Royal Family's private residence.

History and name 

After the Ice Age, around 8000 BC, there were already many people living in what is today the Stockholm area, but as temperatures dropped, inhabitants moved south. Thousands of years later, as the ground thawed, the climate became tolerable and the lands became fertile, people began to migrate back to the North. At the intersection of the Baltic Sea and lake Mälaren is an archipelago site where the Old Town of Stockholm was first built from about 1000 CE by Vikings. They had a positive trade impact on the area because of the trade routes they created.

Stockholm's location appears in Norse sagas as Agnafit, and in Heimskringla in connection with the legendary king Agne. The earliest written mention of the name Stockholm dates from 1252, by which time the mines in Bergslagen made it an important site in the iron trade. The first part of the name means log in Swedish, although it may also be connected to an old German word meaning fortification. The second part of the name means islet and is thought to refer to the islet Helgeandsholmen in central Stockholm. According to the Eric Chronicles the city is said to have been founded by Birger Jarl to protect Sweden from sea invasions made by Karelians after the pillage of Sigtuna on Lake Mälaren in the summer of 1187.

Stockholm's core, the present Old Town (Gamla Stan) was built on the central island next to Helgeandsholmen from the mid-13th century onward. The city originally rose to prominence as a result of the Baltic trade of the Hanseatic League. Stockholm developed strong economic and cultural linkages with Lübeck, Hamburg, Gdańsk, Visby, Reval, and Riga during this time. Between 1296 and 1478 Stockholm's City Council was made up of 24 members, half of whom were selected from the town's German-speaking burghers.

The strategic and economic importance of the city made Stockholm an important factor in relations between the Danish Kings of the Kalmar Union and the national independence movement in the 15th century. The Danish King Christian II was able to enter the city in 1520. On 8 November 1520, a massacre of opposition figures called the Stockholm Bloodbath took place and set off further uprisings that eventually led to the breakup of the Kalmar Union. With the accession of Gustav Vasa in 1523 and the establishment of royal power, the population of Stockholm began to grow, reaching 10,000 by 1600.

The 17th century saw Sweden grow into a major European power, reflected in the development of the city of Stockholm. From 1610 to 1680 the population multiplied sixfold. In 1634, Stockholm became the official capital of the Swedish empire. Trading rules were also created that gave Stockholm an essential monopoly over trade between foreign merchants and other Swedish and Scandinavian territories.  In 1697, Tre Kronor (castle) burned and was replaced by Stockholm Palace.

Throughout Sweden's history, walls were created in Stockholm to defend the city from attacks. These defensive walls were modified throughout the 13th to the 16th century. In 1625, the Great Stockholm Fire of 1625 destroyed the southwestern section of Stadsholmen, an island in the centre of Stockholm. The amount of destruction led to the beginning of the demolition of the Stockholm walls. Today, most of the younger city walls cannot be found anywhere above ground. However, parts of the northern city walls are preserved in the Museum of Medieval Stockholm.

In 1710, a plague killed about 20,000 (36 percent) of the population. After the end of the Great Northern War the city stagnated. Population growth halted and economic growth slowed. The city was in shock after having lost its place as the capital of a Great power. However, Stockholm maintained its role as the political centre of Sweden and continued to develop culturally under Gustav III.

By the second half of the 19th century, Stockholm had regained its leading economic role. New industries emerged and Stockholm was transformed into an important trade and service centre as well as a key gateway point within Sweden. The population also grew dramatically during this time, mainly through immigration. At the end of the 19th century, less than 40% of the residents were Stockholm-born. Settlement began to expand outside the city limits. The 19th century saw the establishment of a number of scientific institutes, including the Karolinska Institutet. The General Art and Industrial Exposition was held in 1897. From 1887 to 1953 the Old Stockholm telephone tower was a landmark; originally built to link phone lines, it became redundant after these were buried, and it was later used for advertising.

Stockholm became a modern, technologically advanced, and ethnically diverse city in the latter half of the 20th century. Many historical buildings were torn down during the modernist era, including substantial parts of the historical district of Klara, and replaced with modern architecture. However, in many other parts of Stockholm (such as in Gamla stan, Södermalm, Östermalm, Kungsholmen and Vasastan), many "old" buildings, blocks and streets built before the modernism and functionalism movements took off in Sweden (around 1930–35) survived this era of demolition. Throughout the century, many industries shifted away from industrial activities into more high-tech and service industry areas.

Stockholm's metropolitan area is one of the fastest-growing regions in Europe, and its population is expected to number 2.5 million by 2024. In 2020 alone, Stockholm's population increased by 1,477. As a result of this massive population growth, there has been a proposal to build densely packed high-rise buildings in the city centre connected by elevated walkways.

Geography

Location 

Stockholm is located on Sweden's east coast, where the freshwater Lake Mälaren — Sweden's third-largest lake — flows out into the Baltic Sea. The central parts of the city consist of fourteen islands that are continuous with the Stockholm archipelago. The geographical city centre is situated on the water, in Riddarfjärden bay. Over 30% of the city area is made up of waterways and another 30% is made up of parks and green spaces.

Positioned at the eastern end of the Central Swedish lowland, the city's location reflects the early orientation of Swedish trade toward the Baltic region.

Stockholm belongs to the Temperate deciduous forest biome, which means the climate is very similar to that of the far northeastern area of the United States and coastal Nova Scotia in Canada. The deciduous forest has four distinct seasons, spring, summer, autumn, and winter. In the autumn the leaves change color. During the winter months, the trees lose their leaves.

For details about the other municipalities in the Stockholm area, see the pertinent articles. North of Stockholm Municipality: Järfälla, Solna, Täby, Sollentuna, Lidingö, Upplands Väsby, Österåker, Sigtuna, Sundbyberg, Danderyd, Vallentuna, Ekerö, Upplands-Bro, Vaxholm, and Norrtälje. South of Stockholm: Huddinge, Nacka, Botkyrka, Haninge, Tyresö, Värmdö, Södertälje, Salem, Nykvarn and Nynäshamn.

Stockholm Municipality 

Stockholm Municipality is an administrative unit defined by geographical borders. The semi-official name for the municipality is City of Stockholm (Stockholms stad in Swedish). As a municipality, the City of Stockholm is subdivided into district councils, which carry responsibility for primary schools, social, leisure and cultural services within their respective areas. The municipality is usually described in terms of its three main parts: Innerstaden (Stockholm City Centre), Söderort (Southern Stockholm) and Västerort (Western Stockholm). The districts of these parts are:

Stockholm City Centre 

 Gamla stan
 Kungsholmen
 Norrmalm
 Södermalm
 Vasastan
 Östermalm

Söderort 

 Enskede-Årsta-Vantör
 Farsta
 Hägersten-Liljeholmen
 Skarpnäck
 Skärholmen
 Älvsjö

Västerort 

 Bromma
 Hässelby-Vällingby
 Rinkeby-Kista
 Spånga-Tensta

The modern centre Norrmalm (concentrated around the town square Sergels torg) is the largest shopping district in Sweden. It is the most central part of Stockholm in business and shopping.

Climate 

Stockholm has a humid continental climate in the 0 °C isotherm (Köppen: Dfb) and an oceanic climate (Cfb) in the -3 °C isotherm. Although winters are cold, average temperatures generally remain above 0 °C for much of the year. Summers are pleasantly warm, and precipitation occurs throughout the year.

Due to the city's high northerly latitude, the length of the day varies widely from more than 18 hours around midsummer to only around 6 hours in late December. The nights from late May until mid-July are bright even when cloudy. Stockholm has relatively mild weather compared to other locations at a similar latitude, or even farther south. With an average of 1900 hours of sunshine per year, it is also one of the sunniest cities in Northern Europe, receiving more sunshine than Paris, London and a few other major European cities of a more southerly latitude. Because of the urban heat island effect and the prevailing wind travelling overland rather than sea during summer months, Stockholm has the warmest July months of the Nordic capitals. Stockholm has an annual average snow cover between 75 and 100 days.

Despite its mild climate, Stockholm is located further north than parts of Canada that are above the Arctic tree line at sea level.

Days above  occur on average 1.55 days per year (1992–2011). Winters generally bring cloudy weather with the most precipitation falling in December and January (as either rain or snow). Spring and autumn are generally cool to mild.

The climate table below presents weather data from the years 1991–2020. According to ongoing measurements, the temperature has increased during the years 1991–2020 as compared with the last series, from 1961 to 1990. For the 2002–2014 measurements some further increases have been found, although some months such as June have been relatively flat.

The temperature has not dropped to below  since 10 January 1987.

The precipitation is not uniformly distributed throughout the year. The second half of the year receives 50% more than the first half. Snowfall occurs mainly from December through March. Snowfall may occasionally occur in late October as well as in April.

In Stockholm, the aurora borealis can occasionally be observed.

Daylight hours 
Stockholm's location just south of the 60th parallel north means that the number of daylight hours is relatively small during winter – about six hours – while in June and the first half of July, the nights are relatively short, with about 18 hours of daylight. Around the summer solstice the sun never reaches further below the horizon than 7.3 degrees. This gives the sky a bright blue colour in summer once the sun has set because it does not get any darker than nautical twilight. Also, when looking straight up towards the zenith, few stars are visible after the sun has gone down. This is not to be confused with the midnight sun, which occurs north of the Arctic Circle, around 7 degrees farther north.

City governance 

The Stockholm Municipal Council is the name of the local assembly. Its 101 councillors are elected concurrently with general elections, held at the same time as the elections to the Riksdag and county councils. The Council convenes twice every month at Stockholm City Hall, and the meetings are open to the public. The matters on which the councillors decide have generally already been drafted and discussed by various boards and committees. Once decisions are referred for practical implementation, the employees of the City administrations and companies take over.

The elected majority has a Mayor and eight Vice Mayors. The Mayor and each majority Vice Mayor is the head of a department, with responsibility for a particular area of operation, such as City Planning. The opposition also has four Vice Mayors, but they hold no executive power. Together the Mayor and the 12 Vice Mayors form the Council of Mayors, and they prepare matters for the City Executive Board. The Mayor holds a special position among the Vice Mayors, chairing both the Council of Mayors and the City Executive Board.

The City Executive Board is elected by the City Council and is equivalent to a cabinet. The City Executive Board renders an opinion in all matters decided by the council and bears the overall responsibility for follow-up, evaluation and execution of its decisions. The Board is also responsible for financial administration and long-term development. The City Executive Board consists of 13 members, who represent both the majority and the opposition. Its meetings are not open to the public.

Following the 2018 Stockholm municipal election a majority of seats in the municipal council is at present held by a centre/right-wing majority and the Mayor of Stockholm is Anna Konig Jerlmyr from the Moderate Party.

The vast majority of Stockholm residents work in the service industry, which accounts for roughly 85% of jobs in Stockholm. The almost total absence of heavy industry (and fossil fuel power plants) makes Stockholm one of the world's cleanest metropolises. The last decade has seen a significant number of jobs created in high technology companies. Large employers include IBM, Ericsson, and Electrolux. A major IT centre is located in Kista, in northern Stockholm.

Stockholm is Sweden's financial centre. Major Swedish banks, such as Swedbank, Handelsbanken, and SEB, are headquartered in Stockholm, as are the major insurance companies Skandia, Folksam and Trygg-Hansa. Stockholm is also home to Sweden's foremost stock exchange, the Stockholm Stock Exchange (Stockholmsbörsen). Additionally, about 45% of Swedish companies with more than 200 employees are headquartered in Stockholm. Noted clothes retailer H&M is also headquartered in the city. In recent years, tourism has played an important part in the city's economy. Stockholm County is ranked as the 10th largest visitor destination in Europe, with over 10 million commercial overnight stays per year. Among 44 European cities, Stockholm had the 6th highest growth in the number of nights spent in the period 2004–2008.

The largest companies in Stockholm, by number of employees (2017):

 Ericsson — 9,850
 Södersjukhuset — 5,640
 Nordea — 4,400
 H&M — 4,390
 SEB — 4,160
 Handelsbanken — 3,000
 Skanska — 2,780
 Keolis — 2,650
 Securitas AB — 2,250
 JAG Personlig assistans  — 2,060
 MTR  — 2,050
 Postnord  —2,020

Fibre-optic network 
The city-owned company Stokab started in 1994 to build a fibre-optic network throughout the municipality as a level playing field for all operators (City of Stockholm, 2011). (City of Stockholm, 2011)

Education 

Research and higher education in the sciences started in Stockholm in the 18th century, with education in medicine and various research institutions such as the Stockholm Observatory. The medical education was eventually formalized in 1811 as Karolinska Institutet. KTH Royal Institute of Technology (Swedish: Kungliga Tekniska högskolan) was founded in 1827 and is Scandinavia's largest higher education institute of technology with 13,000 students. Stockholm University, founded in 1878 with university status granted in 1960, has 52,000 students . It also incorporates historical institutions, such as the Observatory, the Swedish Museum of Natural History, and the botanical garden Bergianska trädgården. The Stockholm School of Economics, founded in 1909, is one of the few private institutions of higher education in Sweden.

In the fine arts, educational institutions include the Royal College of Music, which has a history going back to the conservatory founded as part of the Royal Swedish Academy of Music in 1771, the Royal University College of Fine Arts, which has a similar historical association with the Royal Swedish Academy of Arts and a foundation date of 1735, and the Swedish National Academy of Mime and Acting, which is the continuation of the school of the Royal Dramatic Theatre, once attended by Greta Garbo. Other schools include the design school Konstfack, founded in 1844, the University College of Opera (founded in 1968 but with older roots), the University College of Dance, and the Stockholms Musikpedagogiska Institut (the University College of Music Education).

The Södertörn University College was founded in 1995 as a multi-disciplinary institution for southern Metropolitan Stockholm, to balance the many institutions located in the northern part of the region.

Other institutes of higher education are:
 Military Academy Karlberg, the world's oldest military academy to remain in its original location, inaugurated in 1792 and housed in Karlberg Palace.
 Ersta Sköndal University College
 University College Stockholm
 Swedish School of Sport and Health Sciences
 Swedish Defence University

The biggest complaints from students of higher education in Stockholm are the lack of student accommodations, the difficulty in finding other accommodations and the high rent.

Demographics 

The Stockholm region is home to around 22% of Sweden's total population, and accounts for about 29% of its gross domestic product. The geographical notion of "Stockholm" has changed over time. In the ensuing decades several other areas were incorporated (such as Brännkyrka Municipality in 1913, at which time it had 25,000 inhabitants, and Spånga in 1949). The municipal border was established in 1971; with the exception of Hansta, in 1982 purchased by Stockholm Municipality from Sollentuna Municipality and today a nature reserve.

The population was 975,551 in 2020 and is projected to reach 1,079,213 by 2030. 482,982 of the inhabitants were men and 492,569 women The average age is 39 years; 40.1% of the population is between 20 and 44 years. 411 273 people, or 42.2% of the population, over the age 15 were unmarried. 268,291 people, or 27.5% of the population, were married. 104,099 or 10.7% of the population, had been married but divorced.

As of December 2021, there were 252,750 foreign-born people in Stockholm, making up 25.8% of the population. Around 57.5% of them (143,167) immigrated to Sweden when they were at least 10 years old. 109,213 (43.9%) of them were foreign citizens. The largest nationality groups among the foreign-born people were the Iraqis (16,137), followed by Finns (15,693), Iranians (12,329) and Poles (11,569). 336,275 residents of Stockholm had a foreign-background, 34.4% of the population.

Residents of Stockholm are known as Stockholmers ("stockholmare"). Languages spoken in Greater Stockholm outside of Swedish include Finnish, one of the official minority languages of Sweden; and English, as well as Albanian, Bosnian, Syriac, Arabic, Turkish, Kurdish, Persian, Somali, Dutch, Spanish, Serbian and Croatian.

Stockholm has been home to a significant Finnish-minority since the 13th century. At the end of the 15th century up to 20% of the population in Stockholm consisted of Finns. The  has offered church services since the 16th century, and in 1725 the Finnish Church was opened. 74,000 people in Stockholm have a Finnish-background, which makes Stockholm home to the largest Finnish population in Sweden. Finnish, alongside with Meänkieli and the Sami languages have a protected minority status in Stockholm. This gives the right to use their language when contacting authorities, as well as the right to child and elderly care in their languages. Romani chib and Yiddish are also recognized minority languages, and have a strengthened right to their language in education.

The entire Stockholm metropolitan area, consisting of 26 municipalities, has a population of over 2.2 million, making it the most populous city in the Nordic region. The Stockholm urban area, defined only for statistical purposes, had a total population of 1,630,738 in 2015. In the following municipalities some of the districts are contained within the Stockholm urban area, though not all:

Religion
The Swedish church consists of 27 parishes in Stockholm with almost 50 churches, but also a large number of churches belonging to the free church.

Stockholm has six mosques.

There are three active synagogues and a community of 4,300 members  in Stockholm, which corresponds to 0.4% of Stockholm's population. It is the largest Jewish community in Scandinavia.

Culture 

Apart from being Sweden's capital, Stockholm houses many national cultural institutions. The Stockholm region is home to three of Sweden's World Heritage Sites – spots judged as invaluable places that belong to all of humanity: The Drottningholm Palace, Skogskyrkogården (The Woodland Cemetery) and Birka. In 1998, Stockholm was named European Capital of Culture.

Literature 
Authors connected to Stockholm include the poet and songwriter Carl Michael Bellman (1740–1795), novelist and dramatist August Strindberg (1849–1912), and novelist Hjalmar Söderberg (1869–1941), all of whom made Stockholm part of their works.

Martin Beck is a fictional Swedish police detective from Stockholm, who is the main character in a series of 10 novels by Maj Sjöwall and Per Wahlöö, collectively titled The Story of a Crime, and often based in Stockholm.

Other authors with notable heritage in Stockholm were the Nobel Prize laureate Eyvind Johnson (1900–1976) and the popular poet and composer Evert Taube (1890–1976). The novelist Per Anders Fogelström (1917–1998) wrote a popular series of historical novels depicting life in Stockholm from the mid-18th to the mid-20th century.

Astrid Lindgren lived and worked in Stockholm. Her work Karlson on the Roof is situated close to where she lived in Vasastan, near Vasaparken.

Architecture 

The city's oldest section is Gamla stan (Old Town), located on the original small islands of the city's earliest settlements and still featuring the medieval street layout. Some notable buildings of Gamla Stan are the large German Church (Tyska kyrkan) and several mansions and palaces: the Riddarhuset (the House of Nobility), the Bonde Palace, the Tessin Palace and the Oxenstierna Palace.

The oldest building in Stockholm is the Riddarholmskyrkan from the late 13th century. After a fire in 1697 when the original medieval castle was destroyed, Stockholm Palace was erected in a baroque style. Storkyrkan Cathedral, the episcopal seat of the Bishop of Stockholm, stands next to the castle. It was founded in the 13th century but is clad in a baroque exterior dating to the 1730-40s.

As early as the 15th century, the city had expanded outside of its original borders. Some pre-industrial, small-scale buildings from this era can still be found in Södermalm. Norrmalm, now the central part of the shopping district of Stockholm, was originally a separate city but was incorporated in Stockholm (now Old Town) during the early 17th century. 

Stockholm has had a tradition of applying for building permits in order to erect a building from the early 18th century, with the oldest building permit from 1713. The building permit application tradition is still ongoing which means you can follow a newly built house from 2022 and see all previous buildings all the way back to 1713. Several of the building permits from the early 18th century was renovations and add-ons to older buildings from the 17th century. Today the Stockholm City Building committee is in charge of the building permit process and their old archive, from 1713-1978, is maintained by Stockholm City Archives. All drawings of old buildings from 1713-1874 are digitized and available through the website of Stockholms City Archives.

At the age of industrialization and at the end of the 19th century and Stockholm grew rapidly, with plans and architecture inspired by the large cities of the continent such as Berlin and Vienna. Notable works of this time period include public buildings such as the Royal Swedish Opera and private developments such as the luxury housing developments on Strandvägen.

In the 20th century, a nationalistic push spurred a new architectural style inspired by medieval and renaissance ancestry as well as influences of the Jugend/Art Nouveau style. A key landmark of Stockholm, the Stockholm City Hall, was erected 1911–1923 by architect Ragnar Östberg. Other notable works of these times are the Stockholm Public Library by Gunnar Asplund and the World Heritage Site Skogskyrkogården by Asplund and celebrated architect Sigurd Lewerentz.

In the 1930s modernism characterized the development of the city as it grew. New residential areas sprang up such as the development on Gärdet while industrial development added to the growth, such as the KF manufacturing industries on Kvarnholmen located in the Nacka Municipality. In the 1950s, suburban development entered a new phase, that had already started in the early 1930s, with the introduction of the Stockholm metro. The modernist developments of Vällingby and Farsta were internationally praised. In the 1960s this suburban development continued but with the aesthetic of the times, the industrialized and mass-produced blocks of flats received a large amount of criticism.

At the same time that this suburban development was taking place, the most central areas of the inner city were being redesigned, known as Norrmalmsregleringen. Sergels Torg, with its five high-rise office towers was created in the 1960s, followed by the total clearance of large areas to make room for new development projects. The most notable buildings from this period include the ensemble of the House of Culture, City Theatre and the Riksbank at Sergels Torg, designed by architect Peter Celsing. Other celebrated works from the 1960s was S:t Görans Gymnasium (originally built as a school for women, the School of House work and Sewing) by Leonie Geisendorf.

In the 1980s, the planning ideas of modernism were starting to be questioned, resulting in suburbs with denser planning, such as Skarpnäck. In the 1990s this idea was taken further with the development of an old industrial area close to the inner city, resulting in a sort of mix of modernistic and urban planning in the new area of Hammarby Sjöstad.

The municipality appointed an official "board of beauty" called "Skönhetsrådet" in 1919 to protect and preserve the beauty of the city, still an active part of the city planning, and architecture debate in the city.

Stockholm's architecture (along with Visby, Gotland) provided the inspiration for Japanese anime director Hayao Miyazaki as he sought to evoke an idealized city untouched by World War. His creation called Koriko, draws directly from what Miyazaki felt was Stockholm's sense of well-established architectural unity, vibrancy, independence, and safety.

Museums 

Stockholm is one of the most crowded museum-cities in the world with around 100 museums, visited by millions of people every year.

The Vasa Museum is a maritime museum on Djurgården which displays the only almost fully intact 17th century ship that has ever been salvaged, the 64-gun warship Vasa that sank on her maiden voyage in 1628.

The Nationalmuseum houses the largest collection of art in the country: 16,000 paintings and 30,000 objects of art handicraft. The collection dates back to the days of Gustav Vasa in the 16th century, and has since been expanded with works by artists such as Rembrandt, and Antoine Watteau, as well as constituting a main part of Sweden's art heritage, manifested in the works of Alexander Roslin, Anders Zorn, Johan Tobias Sergel, Carl Larsson, Carl Fredrik Hill and Ernst Josephson. From the year 2013 to 2018 the museum was closed due to a restoration of the building.

Moderna Museet (Museum of Modern Art) is Sweden's national museum of modern art. It has works by noted modern artists such as Picasso and Salvador Dalí.

Skansen (in English: the Sconce) is a combined open-air museum and zoo, located on the island of Djurgården. It was founded in 1891 by Artur Hazelius (1833–1901) to show the way of life in the different parts of Sweden before the industrial era.

Other notable museums (in alphabetical order):
 ABBA: The Museum, an interactive exhibit about the pop-group ABBA
 Swedish Army Museum, Swedish history, from 1500 to the present day with historical objects and realistic scenes
 Fotografiska, museum of photography
 Birka, The Viking City of Birka Swedish sites on the World Heritage List
 Livrustkammaren, the royal armoury, located at Stockholm Palace
 Maritime Museum (Stockholm),  museum for naval history, merchant shipping and shipbuilding.
 Medelhavsmuseet, focused on the ancient cultures around the Mediterranean
 Millesgården, home of the sculptor Carl Milles and now a museum of his works
 Museum of Far Eastern Antiquities,  exciting mix of art and culture from China, Japan, Korea, India and Southeast Asia
 Swedish National Museum of Science and Technology
 Nobel Museum, devoted to the Nobel Prize, Nobel laureates, and the founder of the prize, Alfred Nobel (1833–1896)
 Nordic Museum, dedicated to the cultural history and ethnography of Sweden
 Royal Coin Cabinet, dedicated to the history of money and economic history in general
 Skansen, The world’s first open-air museum with 150 historic buildings, zoo with Nordic wild and domestic animals
 Stockholm City Museum
 Swedish History Museum magnificent medieval art and The History of Sweden exhibition which offers encounters
 Swedish Museum of Natural History
 Toy Museum Stockholm a museum of toys and collectables

Art galleries 
Stockholm has a vibrant art scene with a number of internationally recognized art centres and commercial galleries. Amongst others, privately sponsored initiatives such as Bonniers Konsthall, Magasin 3, and state-supported institutions such as Tensta Konsthall and Index all show leading international and national artists. In the last few years, a gallery district has emerged around Hudiksvallsgatan where leading galleries such as Andréhn-Schiptjenko, Brändström & Stene have located. Other important commercial galleries include Nordenhake, Milliken Gallery and Galleri Magnus Karlsson.

The City of Stockholm also has their own art gallery and museum, Liljevalchs konsthall, with a well visited spring salon every year with works of art from professionals and amateurs. The art showed every spring is sent in anonymously and picked by a committee.

Suburbs 
The Stockholm suburbs are places with diverse cultural background. Some areas in the inner suburbs, including those of Skärholmen, Tensta, Jordbro, Fittja, Husby, Brandbergen, Rinkeby, Rissne, Kista, Hagsätra, Hässelby, Farsta, Rågsved, Flemingsberg, and the outer suburb of Södertälje, have high percentages of immigrants or second generation immigrants. These mainly come from the Middle East (Assyrians, Syriacs, Turks and Kurds) also Bosnians and Serbs, but there are also immigrants from Africa, Southeast Asia and Latin America. Other parts of the inner suburbs, such as Täby, Danderyd, Lidingö, Solna, Nacka and, as well as some of the suburbs mentioned above, have a majority of ethnic Swedes.

Theatre and music 

Distinguished among Stockholm's many theatres are the Royal Dramatic Theatre (Kungliga Dramatiska Teatern), one of Europe's most renowned theatres, and the Royal Swedish Opera, inaugurated in 1773.

Other notable theatres are the Stockholm City Theatre (Stockholms stadsteater), the Peoples Opera (Folkoperan), the Modern Theatre of Dance (Moderna dansteatern), the China Theatre, the Göta Lejon Theatre, the Mosebacke Theatre, and the Oscar Theatre.

Premises for orchestral music and concerts include Stockholm Concert Hall where for example the yearly awarding ceremony for the Nobel prize is held, and The Berwald hall, home to the National Radio Orchestra.

Pioneer of cloud rap Yung Lean, alongside affiliated Drain Gang and Sadboys music collective all are from Stockholm.

Stockholm has hosted the Eurovision Song Contest three times, in 1975 at Stockholmsmässan, and in 2000 and 2016 at Globe Arena.

Amusement park 
Gröna Lund is an amusement park located on the island of Djurgården. This amusement park has over 30 attractions and many restaurants. It is a popular tourist attraction and visited by thousands of people every day. It is open from the end of April to the middle of September. Gröna Lund also serves as a concert venue.

Media 

Stockholm is the media centre of Sweden. It has four nationwide daily newspapers and is also the central location of the publicly funded radio (SR) and television (SVT). In addition, all other major television channels have their base in Stockholm, such as: TV3, TV4 and TV6. All major magazines are also located to Stockholm, as are the largest literature publisher, the Bonnier group. The world's best-selling video game Minecraft was created in Stockholm by Markus 'Notch' Persson in 2009, and its company Mojang is headquartered there.

Sports 

The most popular spectator sports are football and ice hockey. The three most popular football clubs in Stockholm are AIK, Djurgårdens IF and Hammarby IF, who all play in the first tier, Allsvenskan. AIK play at Sweden's national stadium for football, Friends Arena in Solna, with a capacity of 54,329. The 2017 UEFA Europa League Final was played on 24 May between AFC Ajax and Manchester United at the Friends Arena. Manchester United won the trophy after a 2–0 victory.

Djurgårdens IF and Hammarby play at Tele2 Arena in Johanneshov, with a capacity of 30,000 spectators.

All three clubs are multi-sport clubs, which have ice hockey teams; AIK and Djurgårdens IF play in the second tier and Hammarby in the third tier, as well as teams in bandy, basketball, floorball and other sports, including individual sports.

Historically, the city was the host of the 1912 Summer Olympics. From those days stem the Stockholms Olympiastadion which has since hosted numerous sports events, notably football and athletics. Other major sports arenas are Friends Arena, the new national football stadium, Avicii Arena, a multi-sport arena and one of the largest spherical buildings in the world and the nearby indoor arena Hovet.

Besides the 1912 Summer Olympics, Stockholm hosted the 1956 Summer Olympics Equestrian Games and the UEFA Euro 1992. The city was also second runner up in the 2004 Summer Olympics bids. Stockholm hosted the 1958 FIFA World Cup. Stockholm recently bid jointly with Åre for the 2026 Winter Olympics but lost out to the joint bid of Milan/Cortina d'Ampezzo, Italy, if awarded it would have been the second city to host both Summer and Winter Olympics after Beijing and for the 2026 Winter Paralympics and with Åre it would have also be to host all three winter event including Winter Olympic Games, Winter Paralympic Games and the Special Olympics World Winter Games in which Åre would have host in 2021 along with Östersund, however Sweden pulled out host the Special Olympic World Winter Games 2021 due to lack of funding instead it moved to Kazan, Russia and was delayed to 2022. Stockholm first bid for the Winter Olympics for 2022 Winter Olympics, but withdrew its bid in 2014 due to financial matters.

Stockholm also hosted all but one of the Nordic Games, a winter multi-sport event that predated the Winter Olympics.

In 2015, the Stockholms Kungar Rugby league club was formed. They are Stockholm's first Rugby league team and will play in Sweden's National Rugby league championship.

Every year Stockholm is host to the ÖTILLÖ Swimrun World Championship.

Stockholm has hosted the Stockholm Open, an ATP World Tour 250 series professional tennis tournament annually since 1969. Each year since 1995, the tournament has been hosted at the Kungliga tennishallen.

Cuisine 
There are over 1,000 restaurants in Stockholm.  Stockholm boasts a total of ten Michelin star restaurants, two with two stars and one with three stars.

Yearly events and festivals 

 Stockholm Jazz Festival is one of Sweden's oldest festivals. The festival takes place at Skeppsholmen in July.
 Stockholm Early Music Festival, the largest international event for historical music in the Nordic countries. First week in June since 2002.
 The Stockholm Culture Festival is a free recurring cultural festival in August, which is held by the City of Stockholm. Runs in parallel with We Are Stockholm.
 We Are Stockholm is a free youth festival people between 13 and 19 years. Runs in parallel with the Stockholm Culture Festival in August and is held by the City of Stockholm. Between 2001 -2013, the festival went by the name Ung08.
 Stockholm Pride is the largest Pride event in the Nordic countries and takes place in the last week of July every year. The Stockholm Pride festival always ends with a parade and in 2007, 50,000 people marched with the parade and about 500,000 watched.
 The Stockholm Marathon takes place on a Saturday in early June each year.
 The Nobel Banquet takes place at Stockholm City Hall every year on 10 December.
 The Stockholm Water Festival was a popular summer festival held annually in Stockholm between 1991 and 1999.
 Manifestation, a yearly ecumenical Christian festival with up to 25,000 participants.
 Summerburst Music festival
 The Stockholm International Film Festival is an annual film festival held in Stockholm each year since 1990.

Environment

Green city with a national urban park 
Stockholm is one of the cleanest capitals in the world. The city was granted the 2010 European Green Capital Award by the EU Commission; this was Europe's first "green capital". Applicant cities were evaluated in several ways: climate change, local transport, public green areas, air quality, noise, waste, water consumption, waste water treatment, sustainable utilisation of land, biodiversity and environmental management. Out of 35 participant cities, eight finalists were chosen: Stockholm, Amsterdam, Bristol, Copenhagen, Freiburg, Hamburg, Münster, and Oslo. Some of the reasons why Stockholm won the 2010 European Green Capital Award were: its integrated administrative system, which ensures that environmental aspects are considered in budgets, operational planning, reporting, and monitoring; its cut in carbon dioxide emissions by 25% per capita in ten years; and its decision towards being fossil fuel free by 2050. Stockholm has long demonstrated concern for the environment. The city's environmental program is the fifth since the first one was established in the mid-1970s. In 2011, Stockholm passed the title of European Green Capital to Hamburg, Germany.

Role model 
At the beginning of 2010, Stockholm launched the program Professional Study Visits in order to share the city's green best practices. The program provides visitors with the opportunity to learn how to address issues such as waste management, urban planning, carbon dioxide emissions, and sustainable and efficient transportation system, among others.

According to the European Cities Monitor 2010, Stockholm is the best city in terms of freedom from pollution. Surrounded by 219 nature reserves, Stockholm has around 1,000 green spaces, which corresponds to 30% of the city's area. Founded in 1995, the Royal National City Park is the world's first legally protected "national urban park". For a description of the formation process, value assets and implementation of the legal protection of The Royal National Urban Park, see Schantz 2006 The water in Stockholm is so clean that people can dive and fish in the centre of the city. The waters of downtown Stockholm serve as spawning grounds for multiple fish species including trout and salmon, though human intervention is needed to keep populations up. Regarding  emissions, the government's target is that Stockholm will be  free before 2050.

Air quality 
Stockholm used to have problematic levels of particulates (PM10) due to studded winter tires, but by the 2010s they were below limits, after street-specific bans. Nitrogen oxides emitted by diesel vehicles were a problem in the 2010s, but by 2021 they were again below limits, after electric cars had started to replace diesel-driven ones, and pollution regulations for lorries had tightened. As of 2021, the pollutant that exceeds limits is ozone, due to global pollution. In 2021 the average levels for urban background (roof of Torkel Knutssonsgatan on Södermalm) were: NO2 9.7 μg/m3, PM10 9.5 μg/m3, PM2.5 5.1 μg/m3, soot 0.36 μg/m3, ultrafine particles 6100/cm3, SO2 0.4 μg/m3, ozone 53 μg/m3. For urban street level (the densely trafficked Hornsgatan on Södermalm) the average levels were: NO2 23 μg/m3, PM10 17 μg/m3, PM2.5 6.0 μg/m3, soot 0.55 μg/m3.

Transport

Public transportation 

Stockholm has an extensive public transport system. It consists of the Stockholm Metro, which consist of three colour-coded main systems (green, red and blue) with seven lines (10, 11, 13, 14, 17, 18, 19); the Stockholm commuter rail which runs on the state-owned railroads on six lines (40, 41, 42, 43, 44, 48); four light rail/tramway lines (7, 12, 21, and 22); the 891 mm narrow-gauge railway Roslagsbanan, on three lines (27, 28, 29) in the northeastern part; the local railway Saltsjöbanan, on two lines (25, 26) in the southeastern part; a large number of bus lines, and the inner-city Djurgården ferry. The overwhelming majority of the land-based public transport in Stockholm County (save for the airport buses/airport express trains and other few commercially viable bus lines) is organized under the common umbrella of Storstockholms Lokaltrafik (SL), an aktiebolag wholly owned by Stockholm County Council. Since the 1990s, the operation and maintenance of the SL public transport services are contracted out to independent companies bidding for contracts, such as MTR, which operate the Metro. The archipelago boat traffic is handled by Waxholmsbolaget, which is also wholly owned by the County Council.

SL has a common ticket system in the entire Stockholm County, which allows for easy travel between different modes of transport. The tickets are of two main types, single ticket and travel cards, both allowing for unlimited travel with SL in the entire Stockholm County for the duration of the ticket validity. On 1 April 2007, a zone system (A, B, C) and price system was introduced. Single tickets were available in forms of cash ticket, individual unit pre-paid tickets, pre-paid ticket slips of 8, SMS-ticket and machine ticket. Cash tickets bought at the point of travel were the most expensive and pre-paid tickets slips of 8 are the cheapest. A single ticket costs SEK 32 with the card and SEK 45 without and is valid for 75 minutes. The duration of the travel card validity depended on the exact type; they were available from 24 hours up to a year. As of 2018, a 30-day card costs SEK 860. Tickets of all these types were available with reduced prices for students and persons under 20 and over 65 years of age. On 9 January 2017, the zone system was removed, and the cost of the tickets was increased.

The City Line Project 

With an estimated cost of SEK 16.8 billion (January 2007 price level), which equals 2.44 billion US dollars, the City Line, an environmentally certified project, comprises a -long commuter train tunnel (in rock and water) beneath Stockholm, with two new stations (Stockholm City and Stockholm Odenplan), and a -long railway bridge at Årsta. The City Line was built by the Swedish Transport Administration in co-operation with the City of Stockholm, Stockholm County Council, and Stockholm Transport, SL. As Stockholm Central Station is overloaded, the purpose of this project was to double the city's track capacity and improve service efficiency. Operations began in July 2017.

Between Riddarholmen and Söder Mälarstrand, the City Line runs through a submerged concrete tunnel. As a green project, the City Line includes the purification of waste water; noise reduction through sound-attenuating tracks; the use of synthetic diesel, which provides users with clean air; and the recycling of excavated rocks.

Roads 

Stockholm is at the junction of the European routes E4, E18 and E20. A half-completed motorway ring road exists on the south, west and north sides of the City Centre. The northern section of the ring road, Norra Länken, opened for traffic in 2015 while the final subsea eastern section is being discussed as a future project. A bypass motorway for traffic between Northern and Southern Sweden, Förbifart Stockholm, is being built. The many islands and waterways make extensions of the road system both complicated and expensive, and new motorways are often built as systems of tunnels and bridges.

Congestion charges 

Stockholm has a congestion pricing system, the Stockholm congestion tax, in use on a permanent basis since 1 August 2007, after having had a seven-month trial period in the first half of 2006. The City Centre is within the congestion tax zone. All the entrances and exits of this area have unmanned control points operating with automatic number plate recognition. All vehicles entering or exiting the congestion tax affected area, with a few exceptions, have to pay 10–20 SEK (1.09–2.18 EUR, 1.49–2.98 USD) depending on the time of day between 06:30 and 18:29. The maximum tax amount per vehicle per day is SEK 60 (EUR 6.53). Payment is done by various means within 14 days after one has passed one of the control points; one cannot pay at the control points.

After the trial period was over, consultative referendums were held in Stockholm Municipality and several other municipalities in Stockholm County. The then-reigning government (Persson Cabinet) stated that they would only take into consideration the results of the referendum in Stockholm Municipality. The opposition parties (Alliance for Sweden) stated that if they were to form a cabinet after the general election—which was held the same day as the congestion tax referendums—they would take into consideration the referendums held in several of the other municipalities in Stockholm County as well. The results of the referendums were that the Stockholm Municipality voted for the congestion tax, while the other municipalities voted against it. The opposition parties won the general election and a few days before they formed government (Reinfeldt Cabinet) they announced that the congestion tax would be reintroduced in Stockholm, but that the revenue would go entirely to road construction in and around Stockholm. During the trial period and according to the agenda of the previous government the revenue went entirely to public transport.

Ferries 

Stockholm has regular ferry lines to Helsinki and Turku in Finland (commonly called "Finlandsfärjan"); Mariehamn, Åland; Tallinn, Estonia; Riga, Latvia, and to Saint Petersburg in Russia. The large Stockholm archipelago is served by the archipelago boats of Waxholmsbolaget (owned and subsidized by Stockholm County Council). Additionally, there are many for-profit private companies offering tours and regular service in the archipelago.

City bikes 
Between April and October, during the warmer months, it is possible to rent Stockholm City Bikes by purchasing a bike card online or through retailers. Cards allow users to rent bikes from any Stockholm City Bikes stand spread across the city and return them in any stand. There are two types of cards: the Season Card (valid from 1 April to 31 October) and the 3-day card. When their validity runs out they can be reactivated and are therefore reusable. Bikes can be used for up to three hours per loan and can be rented from Monday to Sunday from 6 am to 10 pm.

Airports 

 International and domestic:
 Stockholm Arlanda Airport  is the largest and busiest airport in Sweden with 27 million passengers in 2017.
 Only international:

The Arlanda Express airport rail link runs between Arlanda Airport and Stockholm Central Station. With a journey of 20 minutes, the train ride is the fastest way of travelling to the city centre. Arlanda Central Station is also served by commuter, regional and intercity trains.

Additionally, there are also bus lines, Flygbussarna, that run between central Stockholm and all the airports.

 there are no airports specifically for general aviation in the Stockholm area.

Inter-city trains 

Stockholm Central Station has train connections to many Swedish cities as well as to Oslo, Norway and Copenhagen, Denmark. The popular X 2000 service to Gothenburg takes three hours. Most of the trains are run by SJ AB.

International rankings 
Stockholm often performs well in international rankings, some of which are mentioned below:
In the book The Ultimate Guide to International Marathons (1997), written by Dennis Craythorn and Rich Hanna, Stockholm Marathon is ranked as the best marathon in the world.
 In the 2006 European Innovation Scoreboard, prepared by the Maastricht Economic Research Institute on Innovation and Technology (MERIT) and the Joint Research Centre's Institute for the Protection and the Security of the Citizen of the European Commission, Stockholm was ranked as the most innovative city in Europe.
 In the 2008 World Knowledge Competitiveness Index, published by the Centre for International Competitiveness, Stockholm was ranked as the sixth most competitive region in the world and the most competitive region outside the United States.
 In the 2006 European Regional Growth Index (E-REGI), published by Jones Lang LaSalle, Stockholm was ranked fifth on the list of European cities with the strongest GDP growth forecast. Stockholm was ranked first in Scandinavia and second outside Central and Eastern Europe.
 In the 2007 European Cities Monitor, published by Cushman & Wakefield, Stockholm was ranked as the best Nordic city to locate a business. In the same report, Stockholm was ranked first in Europe in terms of freedom from pollution.
 In a 2007 survey performed by the environmental economist Matthew Kahn for the Reader's Digest magazine, Stockholm was ranked first on its list of the "greenest" and most "livable" cities in the world.
 In a 2008 survey published by Reader's Digest magazine, Stockholm was ranked fourth in the world in its list of the "world's top ten honest cities".
 In a 2008 survey published by the National Geographic Traveler magazine, Gamla stan (the old town) in Stockholm was ranked sixth on its list of rated historic places.
 In a 2008 survey published by the Foreign Policy magazine, Stockholm was ranked twenty-fourth on its list of the world's most global cities.
 In 2009 Stockholm was awarded the title as European Green Capital 2010, as the first Green capital ever in the European Green Capital Award scheme.
 In 2013, Stockholm was named the 8th most competitive city in the world by the Economist Intelligence Unit.
In 2016 Stockholm was one of the cities with the most unicorn companies in the world.
In 2019 Stockholm was awarded the World Smart City Award in the city category for its leadership of the European Smart Cities and Communities project GrowSmarter.

Twin cities and towns 
Stockholm does not have any twin cities.

See also 

 Holmium – a chemical element named after Stockholm
 List of people from Stockholm
 Outline of Stockholm
 Ports of the Baltic Sea
 Stockholm syndrome

References

External links 

 Stockholm—official website
 Stockholm Visitors Board—the official visitors' guide
 Selma Lagerlöf's account of the history of Stockholm, in Ch. VII of The Wonderful Adventures of Nils

 
Capitals in Europe
Coastal cities and towns in Sweden
County seats in Sweden
Metropolitan Stockholm
Municipal seats of Stockholm County
Populated lakeshore places in Sweden
Port cities and towns of the Baltic Sea
Port cities in Sweden
Stockholm urban area
Swedish municipal seats
Populated places in Stockholm Municipality
Members of the Hanseatic League
Cities in Stockholm County